Solenidium is a genus of flowering plants from the orchid family, Orchidaceae. It has three known species, all native to South America.

Solenidium lunatum (Lindl.) Schltr. - Brazil, Guyana, Venezuela, Ecuador, Peru
Solenidium portillae Dalström & Whitten - Ecuador
Solenidium racemosum Lindl. - Brazil, Colombia, Venezuela

See also 
 List of Orchidaceae genera

References

External links 

Orchids of South America
Oncidiinae genera
Oncidiinae